The 1980 Taipei International Championships was a men's tennis tournament played on indoor carpet courts in Taipei, Taiwan that was part of the 1980 Volvo Grand Prix. It was the fourth edition of the tournament and was held from 10 November through 16 November 1980. First-seeded Ivan Lendl won the singles title.

Finals

Singles
 Ivan Lendl defeated  Brian Teacher 6–7, 6–3, 6–3, 7–6
 It was Lendl's 7th singles title of the year and his career.

Doubles
 Brian Teacher /  Bruce Manson defeated  John Austin /  Ferdi Taygan 6–4, 6–0

References

External links
 ITF tournament edition details

Taipei Summit Open